Belambo may refer to one of the following locations in Madagascar:

 Belambo, Ambatolampy in Ambatolampy District, Vakinankaratra Region.
 Belambo, Vohemar in Vohemar District, Sava Region.